The Black Carpet is the second studio album by American reggaeton recording artist Nicky Jam released on December 11, 2007. The first single of the album is "Gas Pela", featuring R.K.M and produced by Monserrate & DJ Urba. The second single is "Ton Ton Ton", featuring R.K.M & Ken-Y and produced by Mambo Kingz.

Track listing

Charts

External links
 The Black Carpet info at cduniverse.com
 The Black Carpet info at AllMusic

References

2007 albums
Nicky Jam albums
Pina Records albums
Albums produced by Rafy Mercenario
Albums produced by Nely